Vijaya Dasa (c. 1682– c. 1755) was a prominent saint from the Haridasa tradition of Karnataka, India in the 18th century, and a scholar of the Dvaita philosophical tradition. Along with contemporary haridasa saints such as Gopala Dasa, Helevankatte Giriamma, Jagannatha Dasa and Prasanna Venkata Dasa, he propagated the virtues of the philosophy of Madhwacharya across South India through devotional songs called  written in the Kannada language. An integral part of Kannada Vaishnava devotional literature, these compositions in praise of the Hindu god Vishnu as well as other deities are called  (compositions of the ). He has influenced both Carnatic music and Hindustani music through his compositions. His ankita (pen name) is Vijaya vithala.

Early years
Vijaya Dasa (Dasappa) was born in a poor Kannada Deshastha Madhva Brahmin family in Cheekalaparvi in Manvi taluk of Raichur district, Karnataka state. His parents were Srinivasappa and Kusamma. He left home at a young age due to poverty. Later he came back with some saints from north India to Cheekalaparvi and some how tried to manage his family but failed to overcome poverty. He went back to Varanasi where he became a scholar. From that day he was called Vijaya Dasa (slave to God), and dedicated his life to spreading Dvaita teachings. Amongst Sri Vijaya Dasa's host of disciples, three were outstanding that have earned the adage “Bakthiyalli Bhaganna, Yukthiyalli Mohanna matthu Sakthiyalli Timmanna”. Bhaganna lived on to become Shri Gopala Dasa, Mohanna was Shri Vijaya Dasa's foster son who became the renowned Shri Mohanna Dasa and Diwan Panganam Timmanna lived on to become Shri Venugopala Vittala Dasa.

Compositions and ministry
His 25,000 extant compositions earned him the title  (noble among the ). His purported miracles include calming the Ganges, entering it without getting wet, preventing a woman from committing suicide, resurrecting his son, and making an uneducated man speak difficult Sanskrit proficiently. He is among the group credited with starting the practice of singing devotional songs while walking up the Tirumala hills in modern Andhra Pradesh. These hills are the location of the Tirumala Venkateswara Temple, an important pilgrim locations for Vaishnava Hindus.

References

Bibliography
 
 
 R. Narasimhacharya, History of Kannada Literature, 1988, Asian Educational Services, New Delhi, Madras,1988 .
 

18th-century Indian philosophers
Madhva religious leaders
Dvaita Vedanta
Carnatic musicians
Scholars from Karnataka
Haridasa
1682 births
1755 deaths
Dvaitin philosophers
Bhakti movement
People from Raichur district
Musicians from Karnataka
18th-century Indian musicians